The Bighorn National Forest is a U.S. National Forest located in northern Wyoming, United States and consists of over 1.1 million acres (4,500 km2). Created as a US Forest Reserve in 1897, it is one of the oldest government-protected forest lands in the U.S. The forest is well east of the continental divide and extends from the Montana border for a distance of  along the spine of the Bighorn Mountains, an outlying mountain range separated from the rest of the Rocky Mountains by Bighorn Basin. Around 99% of the land is above . The forest is named after the Bighorn River, which is partially fed by streams found in the forest. Streams in the range are fed primarily by snowmelt and snowmelt mixed with driving rainfall.

Within the forest is the Cloud Peak Wilderness area in which no motorized or mechanical equipment is allowed. The only access into the  wilderness is on foot or horseback. The Medicine Wheel Passage (U.S. Highway 14A) crosses in the north passing the Medicine Wheel National Historic Landmark, while the Cloud Peak Skyway (U.S. Route 16) crosses the highest pass in the forest (Powder River Pass ) and is located in the southern section of the forest.

The forest headquarters is located in Sheridan, Wyoming. There are local ranger district offices in Buffalo, Lovell, and Sheridan. Visitor centers are located at Burgess Junction and near Shell Falls. Burgess Junction, at the intersection of Route 14 and Route 14A about 25 miles from Dayton, also has a ranger station, visitor accommodation, and campgrounds.

History
The Bighorn National Forest was established as the Big Horn National Forest on 22 February 1897, and encompasses 1,198,080 acres. On 1 July 1908 the name was changed to the Bighorn National Forest through an executive order. In September 1981 the national forest had 1,115,171 acres, with 1,107,670 of those acres being National Forest land.

Climate

According to the Köppen Climate Classification system, the Bighorn National Forest has a mostly subarctic climate, abbreviated "Dfc" on climate maps.

Ecology and recreation
The Bighorn National Forest contains primarily forest along with alpine meadows and lakes at higher elevations. The forest is primarily lodgepole pine, along with several species of spruce, fir, and aspen. While grizzly bears have not inhabited the forest since the early 20th century, black bears are widespread. Grizzly bears have made a comeback in the decades. Other large mammals include cougars, elk, mule deer, pronghorn, and moose. Coyotes are also present in this forest. Numerous lakes are found within the forest and most are naturally stocked with trout and at least 100 other fish species. Meadowlark Lake is a popular recreation area created by the construction of a dam built by Company 841 of the Civilian Conservation Corps in 1936. Water quality sampling from the lakes shows the highest acid rain deposition of any mountain chain in the Rockies.

Gallery

References

Further reading
 Georgen, Cynde.  In the shadow of the Bighorns: A history of early Sheridan and the Goose Creek valley of northern Wyoming.  Sheridan, Wyoming: Sheridan County Historical Society, 2010.

External links
 Bighorn National Forest - U.S. Forest Service

 
National Forests of Wyoming
National Forests of the Rocky Mountains
Civilian Conservation Corps in Wyoming
Protected areas of Sheridan County, Wyoming
Protected areas of Big Horn County, Wyoming
Protected areas of Johnson County, Wyoming
Protected areas of Washakie County, Wyoming
Protected areas established in 1897
1897 establishments in Wyoming